Beckmannia syzigachne, the American sloughgrass, or slough grass,  is an annual or short-lived perennial bunchgrass in the grass family, Poaceae, found in shallow marshes or sloughs.

Beckmannia syzigachne is widespread across much of Europe, Asia, and North America.

Beckmannia syzigachne is one of only two species in the genus Beckmannia; the other being Beckmannia eruciformis.

References

External links

Pooideae
Bunchgrasses of Asia
Bunchgrasses of North America
Grasses of Canada
Grasses of the United States
Plants described in 1846